Garifuna is a genus of shore flies in the family Ephydridae.

Distribution
Belize.

Etymology
Garifuna, is derived from the name of descendants of the Black Caribs who were deported from St. Vincent in 1797 and who settled along the southern coast of Belize.

Species
Garifuna sinuata Mathis, 1997

References

Ephydridae
Brachycera genera
Diptera of North America